De Hamborger Veermaster (Standard German: Der Hamburger Viermaster, English: Hamburg's four-master) is a famous sea shanty sung in Low German, presumably first published between 1850 and 1890. It is partly in English, an adaptation of the shanty "The Banks of the Sacramento", and partly in Low German. Particularly in Northern Germany (the homeland of the Low German language), it was and still is sung as a work song.

Some claim that the "four-master" was the Hamburg America Line sailing ship Deutschland (built in 1847) which at that time was used in transatlantic emigrant transport, but it is unclear whether any specific vessel is in fact referred to. Another source says that the text would refer to the Liverpool steamer Crimean (built in 1865) which had been bought and converted into a sailing ship by the Hamburg shipping company Sloman after 1885. In any case, this is in marked contrast to "The Banks of the Sacramento", which follows a similar pattern but deals with a fast and seaworthy ship traveling the Clipper route and taking "never more than seventy days" "[f]rom Limehouse Docks to Sydney Heads".

Lyrics

See also
 Hamburg
 List of songs about Hamburg

References

External links
Hamborger Veermaster with Text and midi files (in German)


Sea shanties
Songs about boats
Culture in Hamburg
Volkslied